Sevendust is the debut studio album by American rock band Sevendust, released on April 15, 1997 by TVT Records.

The Japan reissue has live versions of the songs "Bitch" and "Prayer" as ending bonus tracks. "My Ruin" appeared on the Mortal Kombat: More Kombat album, credited under the band's original name, Crawlspace. "Too Close to Hate" appeared on the Masterminds album. The song "Terminator" is featured in MTV television series Celebrity Deathmatch.

Sevendust celebrated the 20th anniversary of the release of the album by performing the record in its entirety at a special hometown show on March 17, 2017, at the Masquerade in Atlanta, Georgia.

Release and reception
The album appeared on the Billboard 200, remained there for sixteen weeks and peaked at number 165 on April 4, 1998. It was certified gold by the Recording Industry Association of America (RIAA) on May 19, 1999, and sold at least 732,000 copies in the United States. The album was re-mastered and re-released on June 21, 2010, entitled "The Definitive Edition", featuring two B-sides and two live tracks.

Track listing

Definitive Edition bonus tracks

Definitive Edition DVD
Live and Loud
Electronic Press Kit (1997)
Behind the Scenes & Live Footage

Personnel 
Credits taken from the CD liner notes.

Sevendust
Lajon Witherspoon – lead vocals
Clint Lowery – lead guitar, backing vocals
John Connolly – rhythm guitar, backing vocals
Vinnie Hornsby – bass
Morgan Rose – drums, backing vocals
Technical
 Mark Mendoza – producer, mixing
 Jay Jay French – producer, executive producer
 Denny McNerney – engineering, mixing
 John Nielsen – assistant engineer
 Lou Holtzman – assistant mixer
 Howie Weinberg – mastering

Charts

Album

Singles

Release history

References

Sevendust albums
1997 debut albums
TVT Records albums